Alexei Filippov (born March 8, 1994) is a Russian professional ice hockey player. He is currently playing with Traktor Chelyabinsk of the Kontinental Hockey League (KHL).

On December 27, 2013, Filippov made his Kontinental Hockey League debut playing with Traktor Chelyabinsk during the 2013–14 KHL season.

References

External links

1994 births
Living people
Russian ice hockey forwards
Traktor Chelyabinsk players